Shahrak-e Shahid Dastghib (also Romanized as Shahraḵ-e Shahīd Dastghīb) is a village in Seh Qaleh Rural District, Seh Qaleh District, Sarayan County, South Khorasan Province, Iran. At the 2006 census, its population was 266, in 64 families.

References 

Populated places in Sarayan County